This is a bibliography of literature dealing with the Lewis and Clark Expedition.

The Lewis and Clark Expedition or Corps of Discovery Expedition (1804–1806) was the first transcontinental expedition to the Pacific Coast by the United States.  Commissioned by President Thomas Jefferson and led by two Virginia-born veterans of Indian wars in the Ohio Valley, Meriwether Lewis and William Clark, the expedition had several goals. Their objects were both scientific and commercial – to study the area's plants, animal life, and geography, and to discover how the region could be exploited economically. According to Jefferson himself, one goal was to find a "direct & practicable water communication across this continent, for the purposes of commerce with Asia" (the Northwest Passage). Jefferson also placed special importance on declaring U.S. sovereignty over the Native Americans along the Missouri River, and getting an accurate sense of the resources in the recently completed Louisiana Purchase. c

Books

Children's books

Journal articles

Notes

External links
 Discovering Lewis & Clark – Lewis and Clark Fort Mandan Foundation

Lewis and Clark Expedition
Bibliographies of history
Exploration of North America
North American expeditions
History of the Northwestern United States
History of the Pacific Northwest
History of United States expansionism
Louisiana Purchase
Military expeditions of the United States